Karol "Karcsi" Emil Divín (born Karol Finster; 22 February 1936 – 6 April 2022) was a Slovak figure skater who represented Czechoslovakia. He was the 1960 Olympic silver medalist, a two-time European champion (1958–59), and a two-time World medalist (silver in 1962, bronze in 1964).

Early life 
Divín was born 22 February 1936 in Budapest. His mother, Irma, was Czech, his father, Anton Finster, a Hungarian of German descent, and one of his grandmothers a Slovak. After World War II, the family adopted his grandmother's surname, Divín. They moved to Bratislava, Czechoslovakia, in 1946. In early childhood, Divín was interested in soccer and tennis.

Career 
Divín was introduced to figure skating by his father, who was also his first coach.

At the 1954 European Championships in Bolzano, Italy, Divín stepped onto a major international podium for the first time, taking the bronze medal. He placed fifth at the 1956 Winter Olympics in Cortina d'Ampezzo, Italy.

Following three consecutive years as the European bronze medalist, he won the silver medal at the 1957 European Championships in Vienna, Austria.

Divín won gold at the 1958 European Championships in Bratislava and defended his European title at the 1959 European Championships in Davos, Switzerland. Ivan Mauer became his coach in 1959.

In preparation for the Olympics, Divín practiced a triple loop but tore a muscle and was forced to withdraw from the 1960 European championships. He was sent to the 1960 Winter Olympics after promising that he would finish the competition. Placing second to American David Jenkins and ahead of Canada's Donald Jackson, he won the silver medal in Squaw Valley, California.

Divín won silver at the 1962 European Championships in Geneva, Switzerland, and at the 1962 World Championships in Prague, Czechoslovakia. He was the bronze medalist at the 1964 European Championships in Grenoble, France, and placed fourth at the 1964 Winter Olympics in Innsbruck, Austria. He retired from competition after winning the bronze medal at the 1964 World Championships in Dortmund, Germany.

After ending his competitive career, Divín began coaching in Finland. He was later for many years based in North Bay, Ontario, Canada. He coached Dough Leigh in the late 1960s and worked with Brian Orser on compulsory figures from 1983 to 1987. In the 2000s, he worked with Michal Březina in Brno.

Personal life 
In the 1960s, Divín married Olga Reinišová, a Czech pair skater. They had a son, Peter, who lives in Surrey, British Columbia, Canada, with his wife, Outi, and four children Benjamin, Stephanie, Martina, and Jack. In 1984, Divín married his second wife, Mirka. From this marriage, he has two stepdaughters, Renata, who lives in Brno, and Jana, who lives in Congers, New York, United States. He alternated his residency between Surrey and Brno, Czechia. He died on 6 April 2022.

Results

References

External links 

 
 
 
 

1936 births
2022 deaths
Czech people of Hungarian descent
Czechoslovak male single skaters
Slovak male single skaters
Olympic figure skaters of Czechoslovakia
Olympic silver medalists for Czechoslovakia
Figure skaters at the 1956 Winter Olympics
Figure skaters at the 1960 Winter Olympics
Figure skaters at the 1964 Winter Olympics
Sportspeople from Budapest
Olympic medalists in figure skating
World Figure Skating Championships medalists
European Figure Skating Championships medalists
Medalists at the 1960 Winter Olympics
Universiade medalists in figure skating
Universiade gold medalists for Czechoslovakia
Competitors at the 1964 Winter Universiade